Crabtree Falls is one of the tallest sets of waterfalls in the United States east of the Mississippi River. It is located in the George Washington National Forest in Nelson County, Virginia, off of Virginia State Route 56. The name of the falls is thought to have come from William Crabtree, who settled in this part of Virginia in 1777. L.A. Snead, former US Assistant Fuel Administrator (WWI), environmentalist and notable Nelsonian, spearheaded negotiations to secure land surrounding Crabtree Falls after it was almost developed as a resort area in the late 1960s.  Using personal and Congressional funds, the land deals were completed and the deeds transferred by LA Snead on June 3, 1968, to the National Forest System. This assured benefit for future generations of this magnificent Nelson County treasure.

The cascade with a  drop also gives Crabtree Falls the title of tallest vertical drop in a waterfall east of the Mississippi River. However, the title of tallest free-fall vertical drop goes to Fall Creek Falls in Tennessee's Fall Creek Falls State Park.

There is a trail to the waterfall maintained by the United States Forest Service called the Crabtree Falls Trail. Twenty-nine people have fallen to their deaths from leaving the trail to climb too close to the waterfalls. Recent deaths occurred April 2013, June 2015, and most recently, August 29, 2015.

References

External links
US Forest Service website for the Crabtree Falls Trail
Fee Schedule for Crabtree Falls
World Waterfall entry for Crabtree Falls
Nelson County Webpage for Crabtree Falls
TopoQuest Map of Crabtree Falls

Landmarks in Virginia
Waterfalls of Virginia
Protected areas of Nelson County, Virginia
Landforms of Nelson County, Virginia